Among those who were born in the London Borough of Wandsworth, or have lived/live within the borders of the modern borough are (alphabetical order): 
 Kyle Sinckler — rugby player
 Leomie Anderson - model
 Michail Antonio — footballer
 Jonathan Ansell — singer
 Alun Armstrong — actor
 Martin Bashir — journalist
 Tony Blair — former Prime Minister (shared a house with Lord Charlie Falconer in the Tonsleys on Bramford Road)
 Emily Blunt — actress
 Ernie Bowering — footballer
 Edward James Boys — military historian
 Marcus Brigstocke — comedian
 Ben Bruce — musician, lead guitarist of Asking Alexandria
 Frank Bruno — boxer
 Daisy Burrell — actress
 Charles Bernard Childs — physicist
 Thomas Craig — actor
 Sophie Dahl — model 
 Jack Dee — comedian
 Daniel Defoe — author
 Lesley-Anne Down — actor
 Yootha Joyce — actress
 George Eliot — author
 Lord Charlie Falconer — politician (shared a house with Tony Blair in the Tonsleys on Bramford Road) 
 Jason Flemyng — actor
 Edward Gibbon — historian
 Francis Grose — antiquary, lived in Mulberry Cottage on the Common (1731–1791)
 Thomas Hardy — author (a blue plaque at the junction of Trinity Road and Broderick Road commemorates his residence)
 Ainsley Harriott — TV chef
 Callum Hudson-Odoi — footballer
 Mick Jones — guitarist/songwriter (The Clash, Big Audio Dynamite)
 Mollie King — member of girl band The Saturdays
 Keira Knightley — actress, lived on Swaffield Road 
 Gabrielle Lambrick - civil servant, teacher and historian
 David Lloyd George — former Prime Minister
 Lionel Marson — actor, British Army officer, cricketer
 Martin Marquez — actor
 Ramona Marquez — actor
 Daniel Massey — actor
 Irene Mawer — mime artist and educator
 Michael Nicholson — journalist
 Mark Owen — singer
 Harry S. Pepper — BBC producer and songwriter
 Kevin Pietersen — cricketer
 Steve Sidwell — footballer 
 Phil Spencer — TV presenter
 Jessica Taylor — singer with Liberty X
 William Makepeace Thackeray — novelist
 Louis Theroux — TV presenter
 Paul Theroux — travel writer
 Andrew Wakely — musician
 Penelope Wilton — actor
 Ed Wynne — musician

References

Wandsworth